Peter Nield Whitehead (12 November 1914 – 21 September 1958) was a British racing driver. He was born in Menston, Yorkshire and was killed in an accident at Lasalle, France, during the Tour de France endurance race. A cultured, knowledgeable and well-travelled racer, he was excellent in sports cars. He won the 1938 Australian Grand Prix, which along with a 24 Heures du Mans win in 1951, probably was his finest achievement, but he also won two 12 Heures internationales de Reims events. He was a regular entrant, mostly for Peter Walker and Graham Whitehead, his half-brother. His death in 1958 ended a career that started in 1935 – however, he was lucky to survive an air crash in 1948.

Early life and pre-war racing

Yorkshireman Whitehead, coming from a wealthy background, gained from the wool industry, started racing in a Riley when he was 19. He moved up to an ERA B-Type the following season and then scored the first major result for the Alta, when he finished third in the Limerick Grand Prix, a Formula Libre race. In 1936, he shared his ERA with Walker, and finished third in the Donington Grand Prix. He took the ERA to Australia in 1938 while touring on business, where he scored his first major victory, winning the 1938 Australian Grand Prix at Bathurst, as well as the inaugural Australian Hillclimb Championship. He returned in England in 1939 and gained a third place in the Nuffield Trophy.

Post-war racing career

During World War II, Whitehead was a pilot with the Royal Air Force, and he was back in competition as soon as racing was revived, taking his trusty ERA to second place in the British Empire Trophy, held at the Douglas Circuit on the Isle of Man in the summer of 1947. He also raced in the Lausanne Grand Prix, finishing sixth.

In 1948, he survived a plane crash at Croydon Aerodrome, when he was on his way to Milano, to arrange the purchase a Ferrari 125. The accident left him badly hurt and out of racing for a year.

Grand Prix racer

Peter Whitehead is notable as the first person to whom Enzo Ferrari ever sold a Formula One car: a Ferrari 125 in 1949. With the car painted green, he won the Velká cena Československa. In doing so, he became the first Englishman to win a major international motor race outside of the United Kingdom since Richard Seaman. The following season, Whitehead made his debut in the Formula One championship at Monaco, but did not start. His next outing in the championship came in the Grand Prix l’A.C.F., where he came close to winning but was slowed with a gearbox problem which he dropped to third. That was to be his only podium finished in 11 championship starts between 1950 and 1954.
 
During 1950 season, he won two minor Formula One races, the Jersey Road Race and the Ulster Trophy, but the biggest career victory came in Sports Cars. He continued to race and win in Formula Two across Europe. Later, he added victories in the 1954 Lady Wigram Trophy, in New Zealand, and repeated the feat in 1956 and 1957. He also won the 1956 Rand Grand Prix. All four of those victories, he was driving a Ferrari.

Sports car racing

1950 saw Whitehead start his first 24 Hours of Le Mans race, together with John Marshall in a Jaguar XK120. The pair finished in 15th place.

In 1953, Whitehead decided to concentrate on sports cars, and in July, he saw more success sharing a Jaguar C-Type with Stirling Moss in the 12 Heures Internationales de Reims. He returned again in 1954, in a full works supported Jaguar D-Type to win the event again partnered by Ken Wharton. Prior to that first win at Reims, he also won the Hyères 12 Hours.

Later in 1954, again paired with Wharton, he was placed sixth in the RAC Tourist Trophy road race.

Death

Whitehead's last great performance was at Le Mans in 1958 where he came second in an Aston Martin DB3S, sharing the driving with his half-brother, Graham.  A couple of months later, on 21 September 1958, Peter and Graham were competing together in the Tour de France, when their Jaguar 3.4-Litre crashed off a bridge into a 30-foot ravine at Lasalle, near Nîmes after overturning twice, with Graham at the wheel. Graham escaped with serious but not life-threatening injuries, but Peter was killed instantly.

Racing record

Career highlights

Complete Formula One World Championship results

(key)

Non-Championship Formula One results
(key)

Complete 24 Hours of Le Mans results

Complete 12 Hours of Reims results

Complete 12 Hours of Hyères results

Complete 12 Hours of Pescara results

Complete 12 Hours of Casablanca results

References

Further reading

External links

 Peter Whitehead: 1954 Formula One Season   By Jeremy McMullen  
Peter Whitehead summary of driving career with Jaguar Cars
 

1914 births
1958 deaths
English racing drivers
English Formula One drivers
Racing drivers from Yorkshire
Racing drivers who died while racing
BRDC Gold Star winners
Sport deaths in France
24 Hours of Le Mans drivers
24 Hours of Le Mans winning drivers
World Sportscar Championship drivers
People from Menston
European Championship drivers
Royal Air Force pilots of World War II
12 Hours of Reims drivers